Sulamanaia Fetaiai Tauiliili Tuivasa is a Samoan politician and Member of the Legislative Assembly of Samoa. He is a member of the Human Rights Protection Party.

Tuivasa is a former public servant for the Ministry of Revenue. He is married to Nive Tauiliili a Certified Accountant with seven children. He was first elected to the Legislative Assembly of Samoa in the 2016 election, defeating Cabinet Minister Tuisugaletaua Sofara Aveau.  In 2019 he accused the HRPP government of interfering in public service appointments. Later that year he voted against removing Lands & Titles Court President Fepuleai Atila Ropati from office. He was re-elected in the 2021 election. On 4 May 2022, Sulamanaia was suspended from parliament for a day for raising his voice during a heated argument. He then was called back to Parliament the following day. He remains in the position until the next election 2026.

References

Living people
Members of the Legislative Assembly of Samoa
Human Rights Protection Party politicians
Samoan civil servants
Year of birth missing (living people)